Lasiocercis perroti is a species of beetle in the family Cerambycidae. It was described by Stephan von Breuning in 1957.

References

Lasiocercis
Beetles described in 1957